South Florida Bulls soccer could refer to:

 South Florida Bulls men's soccer
 South Florida Bulls women's soccer